Trenarren is a hamlet northeast of Pentewan in mid Cornwall, England, United Kingdom. A. L. Rowse the historian lived in his retirement in Trenarren House.

Trenarren lies within the Cornwall Area of Outstanding Natural Beauty (AONB). Almost a third of Cornwall has AONB designation, with similar status and protection as a National Park.

See also
John Hext (captain)

References

Hamlets in Cornwall